Little Yellow Mountain may refer to:

 Little Yellow Mountain (North Carolina) in North Carolina, USA
 Little Yellow Mountain (Virginia) in Virginia, USA